Carlo Holse (born 2 June 1999) is a Danish professional footballer who plays as a right winger for Rosenborg.

Club career

FC Copenhagen
Holse made his Danish Superliga debut for FC Copenhagen on 23 September 2017 in a game against Silkeborg.

On 30 January 2019, it was confirmed that Holse would be loaned out to Esbjerg fB in the Danish Superliga for the rest of the season. According to sources, Esbjerg had already tried to sign Holse in the summer 2018.

Rosenborg
31 January 2020, Holse signed a four-year deal with Rosenborg

International career
In November 2020, he was called up to Kasper Hjulmand's senior squad for the friendly against Sweden due to several cancellations from, among others, the Danish national team players playing in England, due to the COVID-19 restrictions, as well as a case of COVID-19 in the squad, which had put several national team players in quarantine. He was on the bench for the game against Sweden.

Career statistics

Club

Honours

Individual
Eliteserien Top assist provider: 2022

References

External links
 
 

1999 births
Living people
Danish men's footballers
Association football midfielders
Denmark youth international footballers
F.C. Copenhagen players
Esbjerg fB players
Rosenborg BK players
Danish Superliga players
Danish 1st Division players
Eliteserien players
Danish expatriate men's footballers
Danish expatriate sportspeople in Norway
Expatriate footballers in Norway